Tulsa is a 1949 American Western action film directed by Stuart Heisler and starring Susan Hayward and Robert Preston, and featured Lloyd Gough, Chill Wills (as the narrator), and Ed Begley in one of his earliest film roles, billed as Edward Begley.

The film's plot revolves around greed, conservation, and romance. It was nominated for an Oscar for its special effects at the 22nd Academy Awards in 1950. The film is no longer copyright protected, and has entered the public domain in the United States.

Plot
The film tells a story about the Tulsa, Oklahoma oil boom of the 1920s and how obsession with accumulating wealth and power can tend to corrupt moral character. The tale begins with the death of rancher Nelse Lansing, who is killed by an oil well blowout while visiting Tanner Petroleum to report that pollution from Tanner's oil production has killed some of his cattle. Lansing's daughter, Cherokee, initially in an effort to punish Tanner for her father's death, acquires drilling rights on her land; she meets Brad Brady, a geologist, who wants drilling to be limited to minimise oil field depletion and preserve the area's grasslands.

Jim Redbird is a native American who has long been drawn to Cherokee and, being persuaded by Brady that cattle men can live and work alongside oil men, buys into her oil business and becomes wealthy. As Cherokee succumbs to power and greed, and becomes a partner of the ruthless Tanner, Jim renounces his holdings. Overcome with anger after a humiliating meeting with Tanner, Cherokee and some of their legal and governmental associates, Jim accidentally starts a fire in a derrick trailing pool.  In its aftermath, in recognition of the destruction caused by improper oil drilling, and how money and power can corrupt even those who love the land, the oil drillers and the geologist vow to start over and to ensure conservation is their top priority..The film received its Oscar nomination for the resulting impressive scenes of the rampaging flames.

Cast
 Susan Hayward as Cherokee Lansing
 Robert Preston as Brad Brady
 Pedro Armendáriz as Jim Redbird
 Lloyd Gough as Bruce Tanner
 Chill Wills as Pinky Jimpson (narrator)
 Ed Begley as John J. "Johnny" Brady (as Edward Begley)
 Jimmy Conlin as Homer Triplette
 Roland Jack as Steve, Cherokee's ranch hand
 Bill Hickman as Bill, the Caterpillar tractor driver (uncredited)

Reception
The film earned an estimated $1.6 million in the US. It recorded a loss of $746,099.

See also
 List of films in the public domain in the United States

References

External links
 
 
 
 
 
 

1949 films
Films set in Tulsa, Oklahoma
Films set in Oklahoma
Films directed by Stuart Heisler
Eagle-Lion Films films
Films set in the 1920s
Films produced by Walter Wanger
Works about petroleum
Films scored by Frank Skinner
American Western (genre) films
1949 Western (genre) films
1949 drama films
1940s American films